Sir Clifford Michael Curzon CBE (né Siegenberg; 18 May 19071 September 1982) was an English classical pianist.

Curzon studied at the Royal Academy of Music in London, and subsequently with Artur Schnabel in Berlin and Wanda Landowska and Nadia Boulanger in Paris. In his early career he was known for his performances of Romantic and virtuoso music, and for championing modern works. Later he concentrated on composers such as Mozart, Beethoven, Schubert and Brahms. He played regularly in continental Europe and North America, making tours in the 1930s and for most of his post-war career.

Although signed to a recording company, Decca, for most of his career, Curzon was not at ease in the studio, and vetoed the release of many of his recordings, some of which were published after his death.

Life and career

Early years
Curzon was born in Islington, London, the younger son and second of three children of Michael Siegenberg, a Jewish antiques dealer, and his wife Constance Mary, née Young. The family name was changed to Curzon in August 1914, shortly after the outbreak of the First World War. The household was musical: Mary Curzon was a talented amateur singer, Michael's sister was a professional singer, and his uncle, the composer Albert Ketèlbey was a frequent visitor, and his performances of his music on the family piano were the young Curzon's earliest abiding musical memories. The boy's first musical studies were as a violinist, but he soon concentrated on the piano.

In 1919 Curzon entered the Royal Academy of Music (RAM) in London, and two years later was admitted to the senior school of the academy at the unusually early age of fourteen. He studied with Charles Reddie, whose own teacher, Bernhard Stavenhagen, had been a pupil of Franz Liszt. Curzon won many prizes, including the RAM's MacFarren Gold Medal, and then continued his studies with Katharine Goodson, who had been a pupil of Theodor Leschetizky. Sir Henry Wood was the conductor of the academy's student orchestra, and in 1924 he gave Curzon his first Promenade Concert engagement, as one of the co-soloists in Bach's Triple Keyboard Concerto in D minor, along with two other students. At around the time Curzon was graduating, his father became seriously ill, affecting the family business; money became short, and in 1926 Curzon, though not drawn to teaching, accepted a salaried post as a sub-professor at the RAM. He continued to pursue a career as a soloist. A family friend introduced him to Sir Thomas Beecham, who was sufficiently impressed by Curzon's playing to engage him as soloist in Mozart's Coronation Concerto at the Queen's Hall.

In 1928 Curzon temporarily left the RAM. A legacy from the mother of a colleague enabled him to move to Berlin for two years, to study with Artur Schnabel. He then studied with Wanda Landowska and Nadia Boulanger in Paris. Curzon believed that his own pianistic style owed much to the examples of Schnabel and Landowska; although, he said, they disliked each other and were diametrically opposite in their musical aesthetics, he learned about phrasing from Schnabel and about precision of technique from Landowska.

While still in Paris, Curzon married the American harpsichordist Lucille Wallace (1898–1977). They had no offspring, but they adopted the two sons of the soprano Maria Cebotari after she and her husband died young.

Soloist
Curzon built a successful career as a soloist, enabling him to resign from the RAM in 1932. In addition to frequent concerts in Britain, he toured Europe in 1936 and 1938 under the auspices of the British Council, and made his US debut in 1939, returning regularly for many years after the Second World War. In his early years as a star soloist Curzon played a more Romantic and virtuosic repertoire than that associated with him in his later career. Established pianists of the time generally ignored concertante works by such composers as Ignacy Jan Paderewski, Vincent d'Indy and Frederick Delius, with which Curzon made a mark. He was also known for his espousal of new music, giving premieres and early performances of works by Germaine Tailleferre, John Ireland, Alan Rawsthorne and Lennox Berkeley among others. During the war, shortage of time prevented him from undertaking the British premiere of Aram Khachaturian's Piano Concerto, but his friendship with Benjamin Britten led to many joint concerts by the two musicians.

Curzon was a highly self-critical performer, and although he signed for the Decca recording company in 1937 and remained with them throughout his career, he was rarely at ease in the studios, and frequently refused to allow the release of recordings in which he felt dissatisfied with his performance.

After the war Curzon began to limit his appearances in the concert hall and recording studios, devoting himself to extensive periods of private study. Throughout his career he maintained a rigorous regime of practice, playing for several hours every day.

Together with Joseph Szigeti, William Primrose and Pierre Fournier Curzon formed the Edinburgh Festival Piano Quartet in 1952. In The Manchester Guardian, Neville Cardus wrote, "They do not quite make an easeful ensemble. The ear is constantly attracted by individual touches of fine musical art, but we receive a sense that each master is playing with his eye on the other, so as not to overstep the bounds of modesty."  As a soloist Curzon made American tours in the years between 1948 and 1970, played at European music festivals and toured the continent with the BBC Symphony Orchestra and Sir Malcolm Sargent in 1954.

From the post-war years onwards, Curzon increasingly concentrated on less virtuoso repertoire than hitherto. He became celebrated for his performances of Mozart, Beethoven, Schubert and Brahms. Max Loppert, his biographer in Grove Dictionary of Music and Musicians, wrote that in the works of these Austro-German classical masters "he was unequalled for sensitivity and directness of manner, beauty of tone and an inner stillness. In such works as Mozart's Concerto in B K595, his unique combination of nervous energy and Olympian calm earned him a reputation as a supreme Mozartian." Another biographer of Curzon, William Mann, wrote: 

Curzon suffered throughout his career from stage fright and, unlike most star pianists, he played not from memory at concerts but with the score on his music stand.  In private life, Mann records, Curzon was "an ideal host, a lively raconteur, a keen connoisseur of painting and literature, and appreciative of other countries and their cultures, food, drink and language."

Curzon died in September 1982, aged 75. He is buried next to his wife in the churchyard of St Patrick's, Patterdale, near their holiday home in the Lake District. On his gravestone are inscribed the opening words of Franz von Schober's poem "An die Musik": "Du holde Kunst" (O fairest art), familiar from Schubert's setting.

Honours
In 1958 Curzon was appointed Commander of the Order of the British Empire (CBE), and in 1977 he was knighted. He was elected a Fellow of the RAM in 1939, and in 1980 he received the Royal Philharmonic Society's gold medal. He was an honorary fellow of St Peter's College, Oxford (1981) and was awarded honorary doctorates by the universities of Leeds (1970) and Sussex (1973).

Notes, references and sources

Notes

References

Sources

External links
Recordings and discography (Youngrok Lee's Classical Music page)

1907 births
1982 deaths
20th-century English musicians
20th-century classical pianists
Alumni of the Royal Academy of Music
Benjamin Britten
Commanders of the Order of the British Empire
English classical composers
English classical pianists
Knights Bachelor
Male classical pianists
Jewish classical pianists
Musicians awarded knighthoods
People from Highgate
Pupils of Artur Schnabel
Royal Philharmonic Society Gold Medallists
20th-century British male musicians